Kiara Leslie (born December 6, 1995) is an American professional basketball player who most recently played for the Washington Mystics of the Women's National Basketball Association (WNBA). Leslie played college basketball for the NC State Wolfpack. After a successful college career at NC State, she was drafted by the Mystics with the 10th overall pick in the 2019 WNBA draft.

Leslie's brother C. J. is also a professional basketball player.

WNBA career statistics

Regular season

|-
| align="left" | 2020
| align="left" | Washington
| 19 || 10 || 21.8 || .352 || .362 || .923 || 3.0 || 1.1 || 0.5 || 0.4 || 0.9 || 5.5
|-
| align="left" | 2021
| align="left" | Washington
| 9 || 0 || 9.6 || .333 || .286 || .875 || 2.2 || 0.2 || 0.4 || 0.0 || 0.4 || 2.8
|-
| align="left" | Career
| align="left" | 2 years, 1 team
| 28 || 10 || 17.9 || .348 || .352 || .905 || 2.8 || 0.8 || 0.5 || 0.3 || 0.8 || 4.6

Playoffs

|-
| align="left" | 2020
| align="left" | Washington
| 1 || 1 || 33.0 || .333 || .000 || 1.000 || 6.0 || 4.0 || 1.0 || 2.0 || 1.0 || 7.0
|-
| align="left" | Career
| align="left" | 1 year, 1 team
| 1 || 1 || 33.0 || .333 || .000 || 1.000 || 6.0 || 4.0 || 1.0 || 2.0 || 1.0 || 7.0

Maryland and NC State statistics 

Source

References

External links
NC State Wolfpack bio
Maryland Terrapins bio

1995 births
Living people
American women's basketball players
Basketball players from North Carolina
Maryland Terrapins women's basketball players
NC State Wolfpack women's basketball players
Shooting guards
Washington Mystics draft picks
Washington Mystics players